John Dorsey may refer to:

John Dorsey (American football) (born 1960), former American football player
John Dorsey is a pseudonym of voice actor, James Carter Cathcart
John Lloyd Dorsey Jr. (1891–1960), Representative from the U.S. state of Kentucky
John M. Dorsey (1900–1978), author, psychiatrist and educator
John H. Dorsey (1937–2018), American attorney and politician in New Jersey
John W. Dorsey (1936–2014), University of Maryland, College Park administrator
Jack Dorsey (born 1976), inventor of Twitter
USS Dorsey (DD-117), a Wickes-class destroyer in the United States Navy